The Sultan River is a river in Snohomish County in the U.S. state of Washington. It is a tributary of the Skykomish River, which it joins at the town of Sultan, Washington. The river is dammed in its upper third by Culmback Dam to form Spada Lake.

Both the Sultan River and the town of Sultan were named by prospectors for the chief of a Snohomish sub-tribe who lived on the Skykomish River in the 1870s. His name was Tsul-tad or Tseul-tud, which was anglicized by the miners into Sultan.

The Sultan River's drainage basin was subjected to intense glaciation during the Pleistocene era. The river flows through a well-defined glacially carved trench. The upper South Fork Sultan River flows through a classic U-shaped valley cut by a glacier through Quartz diorite. The Sultan's river main tributaries—the North Fork, South Fork, Elk Creek, and Williamson Creek— flow through narrow valleys to converge in the lower Sultan basin where the valley floor is relatively broad. The Sultan River exits this basin by plunging abruptly into and through a narrow canyon.

Pleistocene glaciers spread down the valleys of the Sultan River and its tributaries, merging in the lower basin. From there the ice pushed west through what is now the Pilchuck River valley. Today the two rivers are separated by the terminal moraine of an ice front that spread up the Pilchuck valley and impounded the Sultan River, creating a lake. This glacial lake eventually drained westward, creating a delta moraine. The postglacial Sultan River cut through the delta moraine, establishing its present course out of the lower Sultan basin.

Course
The Sultan River originates at Crested Buttes. It flows northwest, then southwest into Spada Lake. Spada Lake, held back by the Culmback Dam, is the main source of drinking water for people in Everett. The South Fork Sultan River joins the main river by flowing into a large arm of the lake’s south shore. The Sultan River exits the lake and flows west, then south to its confluence with the Skykomish River. The river’s largest tributaries are Elk Creek, which joins just above where the river flows into Spada Lake, and Williamson Creek, which flows from remote Copper Lake and enters the lake just below where the river enters it.

South Fork
Formed at the confluence of the North Fork South Fork and Middle Fork South Fork, the South Fork Sultan River flows northwest and empties into the southern arm of Spada Lake.

North Fork South Fork
The North Fork South Fork Sultan River originates at the divide between it and Salmon Creek and flows west. It joins the Middle Fork South Fork to form the South Fork Sultan River.

Middle Fork South Fork
The Middle Fork South Fork Sultan River originates on the east slope of Mount Stickney.

South Fork South Fork
The South Fork South Fork Sultan River begins at the outlet of One Acre Lake, flows north and joins the South Fork just above its mouth on Spada Lake.

History
Prospecting began in the Sultan basin around 1870. Gold deposits were recovered from gravels along the lower river with small-scaler placer operations as early as 1869. Rich deposits were found in the basin some years later. In 1891 a major discovery was made—the so-called "45 vein", worked by the 45 Mine. Development depended on transportation, which came slowly. In 1896 the 45 Mine became the Sultan basin's first producer. A trail was built over Marble Pass to Silverton.

See also 
List of rivers in Washington

References

Rivers of Washington (state)
Rivers of Snohomish County, Washington